Caixa may refer to:

 a Brazilian snare drum
 A Caixa, a 1994 Portuguese comedy film directed by Manoel de Oliveira
 Caixa Econômica Federal, also referred to as Caixa, a Brazilian bank
 Caixa Geral de Depósitos, also referred to as Caixa, the second largest bank in Portugal
 Caixa (São Vicente), a mountain on the island of São Vicente, Cape Verde
 La Caixa, a Spanish banking institution
 La Caixa, Barcelona, headquarters and skyscrapers of La Caixa bank

See also
 Caixas, a commune in the Pyrénées-Orientales department in southern France
 Banco Nossa Caixa, also referred to as Nossa Caixa, a defunct Brazilian bank